Taha al-Hashimi (Arabic: طه الهاشمي ;1961–1888) served briefly as prime minister of Iraq for two months, from February 1, 1941, to April 1, 1941. He was appointed prime minister by the regent, 'Abd al-Ilah, following the first ouster of the pro-Axis government of Rashid Ali al-Kaylani during World War II. When Abdul-Illah fled the country, fearing an assassination attempt, Hashimi resigned, and the government reverted to Kaylani. His younger brother, Yassin, had been Iraqi Prime Minister in 1924 & 1936.

1888 births
1961 deaths
People from Baghdad
Ottoman Military Academy alumni
Ottoman Military College alumni
Ottoman Army officers
Prime Ministers of Iraq
Leaders ousted by a coup
French–Arabic translators
Iraqi translators
20th-century translators